Wianbu is the romanization of the Korean term 위안부 which in turn is the Korean reading of the Japanese term 慰安婦.
Wianbu may refer to:
Ilbongun wianbu (일본군 위안부, lit. Comfort women for the Japanese army), girls and women who were forced into sexual slavery by the Imperial Japanese Army during World War II.
Yankee princess, Prostitutes in South Korea for the U.S. military after World War II.